"Call Me" is a 1981 single by Brooklyn-based funk group Skyy. A popular R&B and dance hit, the single achieved mainstream success by peaking at number twenty-six on the Billboard Hot 100. It was one of only two singles Skyy placed on that chart.

Track listing 
Promo 12" vinyl 
 US: Salsoul / SG-356 
 US: Salsoul / SG-356 DJ

Chart performance

Samples
The song was sampled in Le Knight Club's "Mirage"

See also
List of number-one R&B singles of 1982 (U.S.)

References

1981 singles
Skyy (band) songs
1981 songs
Songs about telephone calls